Year 1105 (MCV) was a common year starting on Sunday (link will display the full calendar) of the Julian calendar.

Events 
 By place 

 Levant 
 February 28 – Raymond IV (Saint-Gilles) dies at his castle of Mons Peregrinus ("Pilgrim's Mountain") near Tripoli. Raymond leaves his 2-year-old son Alfonso I (Jordan) by his third wife, Elvira of Castile, to rule the County of Tripoli. Raymond's nephew William-Jordan, count of Cerdagne, becomes regent over Alfonso. Bertrand, the eldest son of Raymond, inherits the title 'Count of Toulouse'.
 April 20 – Battle of Artah: The Crusaders under Tancred, Norman prince and regent of Antioch, defeat a Seljuk army (some 7,000 men) at Artah (modern-day Reyhanlı). Tancred threatens Aleppo, capital of Sultan Fakhr al-Mulk Radwan, and expands his conquest by conquering more territory east of the Orontes River with minor opposition.
 August 27 – Battle of Ramla: The Crusaders under King Baldwin I defeat a Fatimid expeditionary force (some 15,000 men) at Ramla. Baldwin pillages the enemy camp – but does not further pursue the Fatimids. The battle ends in the last large-scale attempt of the Fatimids to reconquer Palestine.

 Europe 
 The Almoravid emir, Yusuf ibn Tashfin, sends a maritime expedition to Palestine from Sevilla to ward off the Crusaders and perhaps to reconquer Jerusalem. The fleet of about seventy ships rushes into a storm in the Mediterranean Sea, and is never seen again.
 Bohemond I, Norman prince of Antioch, arrives in Apulia (Southern Italy) after an absence of 9 years. He travels to Rome and meets Pope Paschal II. His cousin, Roger II becomes count of Sicily.
 Autumn – Bohemond I and papal legate Bruno travel to the north of France and visit the court of King Philip I (the Amorous). Bohemond gets permission to recruit men throughout the kingdom.
 Inge the Elder dies and is succeeded by his nephew Philip as ruler of Sweden. He and his brother Inge the Younger rule the kingdom together (until the death of Philip in 1118).
 December 31 – Emperor Henry IV is deposed by his son Henry V (who is king of Germany). Henry is forced to resign his crown and is imprisoned in the castle of Böckelheim.

 England 
 Summer – King Henry I invades Normandy, takes Bayeux (after a short siege) and Caen. He advances on Falaise, and starts inconclusive peace negotiations with Duke Robert II (Curthose). Henry withdraws to deal with political issues at home. 
 Henry I meets Anselm, archbishop of Canterbury, under threat of excommunication at L'Aigle in Normandy to settle their disputes that has led to Anselm's exile from England (see 1103).

 Seljuk Empire 
 Sultan Barkiyaruq (or Bar Yaruq) dies in Borujerd (modern Iran) after a 13-year reign. He is succeeded by his son Malik-Shah II, but is deposed and killed by his uncle Muhammad I (Tapar). Muhammad becomes ruler of the Seljuk Empire, but his brother Ahmad Sanjar (Seljuk ruler of Khorasan) holds more power as co-ruler.
 Autumn – Kilij Arslan I, sultan of the Sultanate of Rum, leads a Seljuk expedition to take over Melitene (modern Turkey). He attempts to capture Edessa, but the Crusader fortress is too strongly defended by its garrison. Kilij Arslan then moves on to Harran, which surrenders to him.

 Asia 
 The Tamna Kingdom is annexed by the Korean Goryeo Dynasty.

 By topic 

 Religion 
 Winter – Sylvester IV is elected as antipope in Rome by members of the Roman aristocracy, with support of Henry V.

Births 
 March 1 – Alfonso VII, king of León and Castile (d. 1157)
 March 14 – Drogo, Flemish hermit and saint (d. 1186)
 Alexander III, pope of the Catholic Church (d. 1181)
 Awn al-Din ibn Hubayra, Abbasid vizier (d. 1165)
 Basava, Indian philosopher and statesman (d. 1167)
 Fujiwara no Motohira, Japanese nobleman (d. 1157) 
 Hu Hong, Chinese Confucian scholar (d. 1161)
 Ibn Asakir, Syrian historian and mystic (d. 1175)
 Ibn Tufail, Arab Andalusian polymath (d. 1185)
 John FitzGilbert, Marshal of England (d. 1165)
 Joseph Kimhi, Spanish Jewish rabbi (d. 1170)
 Lope Díaz I de Haro, Castilian nobleman (d. 1170)
 Mahmud II, sultan of the Seljuk Empire (d. 1131)
 Matilda of Boulogne, queen of England (d. 1152)
 Maurice FitzGerald, English nobleman (d. 1176)
 Melisende, queen consort of Jerusalem (d. 1161)
 Odo of Novara, Italian priest and saint (d. 1200)
 Serlo of Wilton, English poet and writer (d. 1181)
 Sophia of Bavaria, German noblewoman (d. 1145)
 Sophie of Winzenburg, German noblewoman (d. 1160)
 Władysław II (the Exile), Polish nobleman (d. 1159)
 Xuedou Zhijian, Chinese Zen Buddhist monk (d. 1192)

Deaths 
 February 28 – Raymond IV (Saint-Gilles), French nobleman
 March 14 – Judith of Swabia, duchess of Poland (b. 1054)
 July 13 – Rashi, French Jewish rabbi and writer (b. 1040)
 November 10 – Sukjong, Korean ruler of Goryeo (b. 1054)
 Abu Esmail Moayed-o-din Togharayi, Seljuk poet (b. 1045)
 Barkiyaruq (or Berk Yaruq), sultan of the Seljuk Empire
 Dagobert of Pisa (or Daimbert), Italian archbishop
 Gregory II (the Martyrophile), Armenian Catholicos
 Huang Tingjian, Chinese calligrapher and poet (b. 1045)
 Hugh of Fauquembergues, prince of Galilee (or 1106)
 Inge the Elder, king of Sweden (approximate date)
 Malik-Shah II, sultan of the Seljuk Empire
 María Rodríguez, countess of Barcelona (b. 1080)
 Peter of Anagni, Italian bishop and papal legate
 Richard II (the Bald), prince of Capua (or 1106)
 Shōshi, Japanese empress consort (b. 1027)
 Simon of Hauteville, count of Sicily (b. 1093)

References